The Amarakosha (Devanagari: अमरकोशः , IAST: Amarakośaḥ , ISO: Amarakōśaḥ) is the popular name for Namalinganushasanam (Devanagari: नामलिङ्गानुशासनम् ,  IAST: Nāmaliṅgānuśāsanam, ISO: Nāmaliṅgānuśāsanam, which means "instruction concerning nouns and gender") a thesaurus in Sanskrit written by the ancient Indian scholar Amarasimha. The name Amarakosha derives from the Sanskrit words amara ("immortal") and kosha ("treasure, casket, pail, collection, dictionary").

According to Arthur Ba Keith, this is one of the oldest extant Sanskrit lexicons (kosha). According to Keith, Amarasiṃha, who possibly flourished in the 6th century, " knew the Mahāyāna and used Kālidāsa."

The author himself mentions 18 prior works, but they have all been lost. There have been more than 40 commentaries on the Amarakosha.

Author 

Amarasimha is said to have been one of the Navaratnas ("nine gems") at the court of Vikramaditya of Ujjain, the legendary king who reigned around 57 BC. Some sources indicate that he belonged to the period of Vikramaditya of the 7th century.

Mirashi examines the question of the date of composition of Amarakosha. He finds the first reliable mention in Amoghavritti of Shakatayana composed during the reign of Amoghavarsha (814-867 CE).

Textual organisation
The Amarakośa consists of verses that can be easily memorized. It is divided into three s or chapters. The first,  ("heaven and others") has words about heaven and the Gods and celestial beings who reside there. The second,  ("earth and others") deals with words about earth, towns, animals, and humans. The third,  ("common") has words related to grammar and other miscellaneous words.

Svargādikāṇḍa, the first kāṇḍa of the Amarakośa begins with the verse 'Svar-avyayaṃ-Svarga-Nāka-Tridiva-Tridaśālayāḥ' describing various names of Heaven viz. Svaḥ, Svarga, Nāka, Tridiva, Tridaśālaya, etc. The second verse 'Amarā Nirjarā DevāsTridaśā Vibudhāḥ Surāḥ’ describes various words that are used for the Deva-s (Gods). The fifth and sixth verses give various names of Buddha and Śākyamuni (i.e. Gautam Buddha). The following verses give the different names of Brahmā, Viṣṇu, Vasudeva, Balarāma, Kāmadeva, Lakṣmī, Kṛṣṇa, Śiva, Indra, etc. All these names are treated with great reverence. While Amarasiṃha is regarded to have been a Bauddha (Buddhist), Amarakośa reflects the period before the rise of sectarianism. Commentaries on Amarakosha have been written by Hindu, Jain and well as Buddhist scholars.

The second kāṇḍa, Bhuvargādikāṇḍa, of the Amarakosha is divided into ten Vargas or parts. The ten Vargas are Bhuvarga (Earth), Puravarga (Towns or Cities), Shailavarga (Mountains), Vanoshadivarga (Forests and medicines), Simhadivarga (Lions and other animals), Manushyavarga (Mankind), Bramhavarga (Brahmana), Kshatriyavarga (Kshatriya), Vysyavarga (Vaishya) and Sudravarga (Sudra).

The Third Kanda, Sāmānyādikāṇḍa contains Adjectives, Verbs, words related to prayer, business, etc. The first verse Kshemankaroristatathi Shivathathi Shivamkara gives the Nanarthas of the word Shubakara or propitious as Kshemankara, Aristathathi, Shivathathi, and Shivamkara. 

It is still used as one of the major source of Sanskrit grammar. It was widely taught in gurukulas. One of the finest collections till date.

Commentaries
 Amarakoshodghātana by  Kṣīrasvāmin (11th century CE, the earliest commentary)
 Tīkāsarvasvam by Vandhyaghatīya Sarvānanda (12th century)
 Rāmāsramī (Vyākhyāsudha) by Bhānuji Dīkshita
 Padachandrikā by Rāyamukuta
 Kāshikavivaranapanjikha by Jinendra Bhudhi
 Pārameśwari by Parameswaran Mōsad in Malayalam
 A Telugu commentary by Linga Bhatta (12th century)

Translations
"Gunaratha" of Ujjain translated it into Chinese in the 7th century.

The Pali thesaurus Abhidhānappadīpikā, composed in the twelfth century by the grammarian Moggallāna Thera, is based on the Amarakosha.

References

Bibliography
 Krsnaji Govinda Oka, Poona City, Law Printing Press, 1913
 Amarakosha at sanskritdocuments.org
 Amarakosha files by Avinash Sathaye
 The Nâmalingânusâsana (Amarakosha) of Amarasimha; with the commentary (Amarakoshodghâtana) of Kshîrasvâmin (1913) at the Internet Archive.
 A web interface to access the knowledge structure in Amarakosha at Department of Sanskrit Studies, University of Hyderabad.

Sanskrit dictionaries
Sanskrit texts
Ancient Indian literature
Early medieval literature
History of literature
Thesauri